Japan participated in the 2014 Asian Beach Games in Phuket, Thailand from 14 – 23 November 2014.

Medallist

|  style="text-align:left; width:78%; vertical-align:top;"|

|  style="text-align:left; width:22%; vertical-align:top;"|

Competitors

Air sports

Paragliding accuracy

Beach flag football 

group play

semifinals

final rank

Beach Handball

Men's Tournament

Women's Tournament

Beach Soccer 

Group Play

quarterfinal

semifinal

final rank

Beach Volleyball

Extreme Sports

Inline Skate

Kurash

Sailing 

men

women

Triathlon

Triathlon

Waterskiing

Skiing
 Men

 Women

References

Nations at the 2014 Asian Beach Games
2014
Asian Beach Games